The American Fork Second Ward Meetinghouse is an eclectic Gothic Revival building on South Street in American Fork, Utah. Built from 1903 to 1904, it served as a meetinghouse for the Church of Jesus Christ of Latter-day Saints until 1982.  It is believed that the building was designed by James H. Pulley, a local carpenter and builder.  A large addition built in 1929 was designed by architects Young and Hansen of Salt Lake City.  In 1984, the building was sold to Michael Bigelow.  It became the home of Bigelow & Co. Organ Builders.  It was listed on the National Register of Historic Places in 1992.

See also
American Fork Third Ward Meetinghouse, also NRHP-listed

References

Churches completed in 1903
Former Latter Day Saint religious buildings and structures
Gothic Revival church buildings in Utah
Meetinghouses of the Church of Jesus Christ of Latter-day Saints in Utah
Churches on the National Register of Historic Places in Utah
Religious buildings and structures in Utah County, Utah
Buildings and structures in American Fork, Utah
National Register of Historic Places in Utah County, Utah